Lewis Dominic Thill (October 18, 1903 – May 6, 1975) was a U.S. Representative from Wisconsin.

Born in Milwaukee, Wisconsin, Thill attended the public and parochial schools and graduated from Marquette University, Milwaukee, Wisconsin, in 1926.

Personal life
He attended Harvard Graduate School, and Northwestern University, in Evanston, Illinois. He graduated from the law department of the University of Wisconsin–Madison in 1931. He was admitted to the bar in 1932 and commenced practice in Milwaukee, Wisconsin. He engaged in the real estate and investment business. He moved to San Diego, California, where he died on May 6, 1975. He is entombed in the Holy Cross Cemetery.

Political career
Thill was elected as a Republican to the Seventy-sixth and the Seventy-seventh Congresses (January 3, 1939 – January 3, 1943) as the representative of Wisconsin's 5th congressional district.
He was an unsuccessful candidate for reelection in 1942 to the Seventy-eighth Congress and for election in 1944 to the Seventy-ninth Congress.

References

1903 births
1975 deaths
Marquette University alumni
Harvard University alumni
Northwestern University alumni
University of Wisconsin Law School alumni
California Republicans
Republican Party members of the United States House of Representatives from Wisconsin
20th-century American politicians